"Beam me up, Scotty" is a catchphrase and misquotation that made its way into popular culture from the science fiction television series Star Trek: The Original Series. It comes from the command Captain Kirk gives his chief engineer, Montgomery "Scotty" Scott, when he needs to be transported back to the Starship Enterprise.

Though it has become irrevocably associated with the series and films, the exact phrase was never actually spoken in any Star Trek television episode or film. Despite this, the quote has become a phrase of its own over time. It can be used to describe one's desire to be elsewhere, technology such as teleportation, slang for certain drugs, or as a phrase to show appreciation and association with the television show.

Precise quotations 
Despite the phrase entering into popular culture, it is a misquotation and has never been said in any of the television series or films, contrary to popular belief. There have, however, been several "near misses" of phrasing.

In the Original Series episodes "The Gamesters of Triskelion" and "The Savage Curtain", Kirk said, "Scotty, beam us up"; while in the episode "This Side of Paradise", Kirk simply said, "Beam me up". In the episode “The Cloud Minders“, Kirk says, “Mr. Scott, beam us up.”

The animated episodes "The Lorelei Signal" and "The Infinite Vulcan" used the phrasing "Beam us up, Scotty".

The original film series has the wording "Scotty, beam me up" in Star Trek IV: The Voyage Home and "Beam them out of there, Scotty" in Star Trek Generations.

The complete phrase was eventually said by William Shatner in the audio adaptation of his non-canon novel Star Trek: The Ashes of Eden.

Legacy 
The popularity of the misquotation has led to many new phrases, both associated with Star Trek or otherwise.

The misquotation's influence led to James Doohan, the actor who played Scotty, to be misrepresented in his own obituary. In it, he is referenced as the character who "responded to the command, 'Beam me up, Scotty, despite having never responded to this exact command in the show. Doohan himself chose to use the phrase as the title of his 1996 autobiography.

The quote "Beam me up, Scotty!" has been extended beyond its original meaning to describe an expression of "the desire to be elsewhere", or the desire to be out of an unwanted situation. Along with this, it has been associated with things that are futuristic, such as the possibility of teleportation.

The phrase has also been used as slang for certain drugs. An Oxford Reference page defined "Beam me up, Scotty" as "a mixture of phencyclidine and cocaine" and to "talk to Scotty", "high off Scotty", "see Scotty", etc.

The phrase has been referenced by Baxter County Sheriff's drug slang definitions. It is also referenced in the book "Vice Slang" by Tom Dalzell and Terry Victor, for crack cocaine, and to describe "Beamers" or "Beemers" as those taking said drugs.

The exact timing of when the phrase became popular is unclear. However, early signs of the quote's usage to describe something separate from Star Trek can be found roughly ten years after Star Trek'''s airing in 1966, in a publication of the Royal Aeronautical Journal. It describes a certain routine as "a sort of 'beam me up, Scotty routine. Over time, the phrase has been extended to, "Beam me up, Scotty, there's no intelligent life down here!", popularized on bumper stickers and t-shirts, despite neither quote ever being said on the show.  

A character in the 1993 educational video game Where in Space is Carmen Sandiego? is named "Bea Miupscotti."

The planetarium in the animated series South Park (1997) carries the inscription "Me transmitte sursum, Caledoni!", which is a translation of the misquotation into Latin.

The quote was used in the movie Armageddon'' (1998) by Rockhound, the character played by Steve Buscemi. When asked by Harry S. Stamper (played by Bruce Willis) if Rockhound would join them to divert the asteroid, he replies "You know me. Beam me up, Scotty"

The quote was also used by American rapper Nicki Minaj as the title of, as well as the name of a track, on her third mixtape Beam Me Up Scotty.

The pop-culture centric wiki TV Tropes uses the phrase to refer to quotes that are never actually said in a certain work in spite of popular belief.

See also 
Misquotations
James Traficant, a U.S. Congressman from Ohio who used the catchphrase during his service (1985–2002) in the U.S. House of Representatives from 1997 to 2002.
Beam me up Scotty (mixtape)
Beam Me Up, Scotty (D.C. Scorpio song)

References

Further reading 
 
 

Star Trek sayings
Snowclones
1968 neologisms
1968 in American television
Running gags
Misquotations